Whitehaven is an unincorporated community and census-designated place in Wicomico County, Maryland, United States. Its population was 43 as of the 2010 census. It is part of the Salisbury, Maryland-Delaware Metropolitan Statistical Area.

Whitehaven is home to the Whitehaven Ferry, one of the few remaining public ferries in Maryland, and was once a thriving settlement which included stores, a shipyard, and the Whitehaven Hotel.  It is the location of the Whitehaven Historic District.  The ferry runs between Whitehaven and Mt. Vernon, Somerset County and takes approximately 5 minutes to make a crossing.

The Whitehaven Historic District and Whitehaven Hotel are listed on the National Register of Historic Places.

Demographics

References

 
Census-designated places in Maryland
Census-designated places in Wicomico County, Maryland
Salisbury metropolitan area